The Last Judgment is a triptych created by a follower of Hieronymus Bosch. Unlike the other two triptychs with the same name, in Vienna and in Bruges, only a fragment of this one exists today. It resides at the Alte Pinakothek in Munich.

After being damaged, this fragment was heavily repainted, then the paint was removed in 1936.

References

1500s paintings
Paintings by Hieronymus Bosch
Collection of the Alte Pinakothek